Non-refoulement is a fundamental principle of international law that forbids a country receiving asylum seekers from returning them to a country in which they would be in likely danger of persecution based on "race, religion, nationality, membership of a particular social group or political opinion". Unlike political asylum, which applies to those who can prove a well-grounded fear of persecution based on certain category of persons, non-refoulement refers to the generic repatriation of people, including refugees into war zones and other disaster locales. It is a principle of customary international law, as it applies even to states that are not parties to the 1951 Convention Relating to the Status of Refugees or its 1967 Protocol. It is also a principle of the trucial law of nations.

It is debatable whether non-refoulement is a jus cogens of international law. If so, international law would permit no abridgments for any purpose or under any circumstances. The debate over this matter was rekindled following the September 11, 2001 terror attacks in the United States as well as other terrorist attacks in Europe.

History
The Convention relating to the International Status of Refugees, of 28 October 1933 was ratified by nine States, including France and (with a caveat) the United Kingdom. It was by virtue of this Convention that the principle of non-refoulement acquired the status of international treaty law.

The principle of non-refoulement is important because of its role in an international collective memory of the failure of nations during World War II to provide a haven to refugees fleeing certain genocide at the hands of Nazi Germany. Following World War II, the need for international checks on state sovereignty over refugees became apparent to the international community. 

During the war, several states had forcibly returned or denied admission to German and French Jews fleeing the Holocaust. In 1939, the ocean liner MS St. Louis sailed from Germany with over 900 Jewish passengers who were fleeing Nazi persecution. The ship sailed for Cuba, where the passengers expected to find refuge. However, Cuba admitted only twenty-eight passengers and refused to admit the rest. The ship then set sail for Florida in the hopes of finding refuge in the United States. But the U.S. government, and later also Canada, refused to allow the ship to dock and refused to accept any passengers. With conditions on the ship deteriorating and seemingly nowhere else to go, the ship returned to Europe, where approximately thirty percent of those passengers were later murdered in the Holocaust. Switzerland refused entry to nearly 20,000 French Jews who sought asylum there after the Nazi takeover of France. The Swiss argued the "boat is full" with respect to refugees during the War, and they were not obligated under existing law to accept French Jews for resettlement. As a result the Jews were forced to return to France, where most were killed.

After WW2, under Operation Keelhaul, millions of refugees and prisoners from former Russia and the contemporary Soviet Union were forcibly returned despite evidence they would face persecution from the Soviet government. The action is considered a human rights violation and a war crime for its indiscriminate targeting of civilians, many of whom had never been Soviet citizens, fleeing Russia near the end of WW2.

Non-refoulement presents an inherent conflict with state sovereignty, as it infringes on a state's right to exercise control over its own borders and those who reside within them. In legal proceedings immediately following World War II, non-refoulement was viewed as a distinct right, which could be abridged under certain circumstances, such as those spelled out in Article 33, Section 2 of the 1951 Convention.

In the 1960s, the European Commission on Human Rights recognized non-refoulement as a subsidiary of prohibitions on torture. As the ban on torture is jus cogens, this linkage rendered the prohibition on refoulement absolute and challenged the legality of refoulement for the purposes of state security. Through court cases (see Soering v. United Kingdom and Chahal v. United Kingdom) and interpretations of various international treaties in the 1980s, the European Commission on Human Rights shifted preference away from preserving state sovereignty and towards protecting persons who might be refouled. This interpretation permitted no abridgments of non-refoulement protections, even if the state was concerned a refugee may be a terrorist or pose other immediate threats to the state.

Following terror attacks in the United States and Europe, states have renewed calls for permitting refoulement in the interest of national security, as repatriation is the most effective method of dispatching refugees thought to present a credible threat. Furthermore, newer treaties typically include specific obligations that prevent refoulement under essentially any circumstances. These factors have led individual states and the European Union to seek ways around non-refoulement protections that balance security and human rights.

Today, the principle of non-refoulement ostensibly protects persons from being expelled from countries that are signatories to the 1951 Convention Relating to the Status of Refugees, the 1967 Protocol Convention Relating to the Status of Refugees, or the 1984 Convention Against Torture. This, however, has not prevented certain signatory countries from skirting the international law principle and repatriating or expelling persons into the hands of potential persecutors.

Relevant laws

Interpretations

Though the principle of non-refoulement is a non-negotiable aspect of international law, states have interpreted Article 33 of the 1951 Convention in various ways, and they have constructed their legal responses to asylum seeker in corresponding manners. The four most common interpretations are:

StrictThis interpretation holds that non-refoulement laws only apply to asylum seekers who have physically entered a state's borders. States using this interpretation often enact policies and procedures designed to block asylum seekers from reaching their borders.
Strict, with a narrow reading This interpretation holds that only certain refugees are legally entitled to non-refoulement protection. If the country receiving an asylum seeker does not find that their "life or freedom would be threatened" by refoulement, this interpretation holds that they can be legitimately returned to their country of origin.
Collectivist This approach involves international systems designed to process the asylum claim in the country in which a person initially seeks asylum and redistribute them among other countries. This approach relies on the logic that Article 33 does not include language requiring states receiving asylum seekers to permit them to remain permanently, only an obligation not to send them back to a region in which they face likely danger. Refugee relocation agreements between countries must ensure they are not sent back by the new host country. The new host country does not have to be party to the 1951 Convention, however.
Collectivist, with laws preventing asylum seekers from reaching sovereign borders This approach is not an interpretation of Article 33, but a way around it. It combines the strict and collectivist approaches. States using this approach establish non-sovereign areas within their borders, primarily at travel hubs. Asylum seekers presenting themselves at such areas are then sent to another country to have their asylum claims processed. As with traditional collectivism, the asylum seeker cannot be sent to a country in which they face likely danger.

Examples of violations
Thailand's forcible repatriation of 45,000 Cambodian refugees at Prasat Preah Vihear, on 12 June 1979, is considered to be a classic example of refoulement. The refugees were forced at gunpoint across the border and down a steep slope into a minefield. Those who refused were shot by Thai soldiers. Approximately 3,000 refugees (about 7 percent) died.

Tanzania's actions during the Rwandan genocide in 1994 have been alleged to have violated the non-refoulement principle. During the height of the crisis, when the refugee flows rose to the level of a "mass exodus", the Tanzanian government closed its borders to a group of more than 50,000 Rwandan refugees fleeing genocidal violence. In 1996, before Rwanda had reached an appropriate level of stability, around 500,000 refugees were returned to Rwanda from Zaire.

One of the grey areas of law that is most hotly debated within signatory circles is the interpretation of Article 33 of the 1951 Convention. Interdiction of potential refugee transporting vessels on the high seas has been a common practice by the US government in particular, raising the question of whether Article 33 requires a refugee to be within a country or simply within the power of a country to trigger the right against refoulement.

The Australian government has been accused by the UNHCR, as well as more than 50 Australian legal scholars, of violating the principle of non-refoulement by returning 41 Tamil and Singhalese refugees to the Sri Lankan Navy in June or July 2014, as part of Operation Sovereign Borders.

In 2014, the Australian Parliament passed the Migration and Maritime Powers Legislation Amendment (Resolving the Asylum Legacy Caseload) Act 2014 (Cth). That Act provides that "for the purposes of removal from Australia of an unlawful non-citizen, Australia's non-refoulement obligations are irrelevant".

In 2017, Dina Ali Lasloom was forced back to Saudi Arabia with the cooperation of the government of the Philippines.

In 2018 Matteo Salvini (Italy's former interior minister) allegedly breached its obligation of non-refoulement by refusing to rescue 93 migrants fleeing Libya and consequently organising a "privatised push-back", that is sending back migrants using merchant ships as proxy; which in this case resulted in the migrants being returned to the port of Misurata in Libya, where they were beaten, tortured and in some cases killed.

In 2019, South Korea deported two North Korean defectors back to North Korea, on claims that they had committed murder. The move was condemned by human rights activists as the two would likely face execution upon their return. China routinely deports North Korean refugees who remain on its soil under a 1986 agreement with the North Korean government.

In 2021, Malaysia deported 1,086 Myanmar nationals, despite a court order temporarily halting the repatriation amid concerns the group could be at risk if they were returned to military-ruled Myanmar.

In 2021, the Supreme Court of India in Mohammad Salimullah v. Union of India, allowed the deportation of Rohingya Muslim refugees back to Myanmar.

See also
Border
Impediment to expulsion
Monism and dualism in international law

References

Literature
 Kees Wouters International legal standards for the protection from refoulement - a legal analysis of the prohibitions on refoulement contained in the Refugee Convention, the European Convention on Human Rights, the International Covenant on Civil and Political Rights and the Convention against Torture, Antwerpen: Intersentia, 2009
 Guy S. Goodwin-Gill & Jane McAdam The refugee in international law, Oxford: Oxford UP, 2007 (prev. 1983, 1996)
 Académie de Droit International de La Haye / Hague Academy of International Law Le droit d'asile = The right of asylum, Dordrecht: Nijhoff (1990)

External links

Defining the parameters of the non-refoulement principle, LLM thesis
Vladislava Stoyanova, "The Principle of Non-Refoulement and the Right of Asylum Seekers to Enter State Territory." Interdisciplinary Journal of Human Rights Law, Vol. 3, Issue 1, 2008.

1933 introductions
International law
League of Nations
Refugees
Right of asylum
Statelessness